Morris is a given name in English and other languages. Notable persons with that name include:

People with the mononym
This section lists people commonly referred to solely by this name
Morris, one of the 14 Tribes of Galway, Ireland
Morris (cartoonist) (1923–2001), pen name of Belgian cartoonist Maurice De Bevere, creator of Lucky Luke
Morris (singer) (born 1976), Romanian singer and DJ
Mixmaster Morris (born 1965), English ambient DJ and underground musician

People with the given name
Morris Albert (born 1951), real name Maurício Alberto Kaisermann, Brazilian singer and songwriter
Morris Almond (born 1985), American professional basketball player 
Morris Ankrum (1896–1964), American radio, television and film actor
 Morris "Morrie" Arnovich (1910–1959), American Major League Baseball All-Star outfielder
Morris Barry (1918–2000), English radio producer
Morris Bates (1864–1905), English footballer
Morris Beckman (architect), American architect
Morris Beckman (writer) (1921–2015), English writer
Morris "Moe" Berg (1902–1972), American baseball player and spy
Morris Bishop (1893–1973), American scholar, historian, biographer, author, and humorist
Morris Carnovsky (1897–1992), American stage and film actor 
Morris Chestnut (born 1969), American film and television actor
Morris Chang (born 1931), Taiwanese businessman
Morris Childs (1902–1991), real name Moishe Chilovsky, American political activist
Morris Cerullo (1931–2020), American Pentecostal televangelist
Morris Chapman (born 1940), American church executive
Morris Claiborne (born 1990), American football player
Morris Cohen (adventurer) (1887–1970), known as Morris "Two-Gun" Cohen", adventurer 
Morris Cohen (scientist) (1911–2005), American professor of metallurgy
Morris Cohen (spy) (1910–1995), a.k.a. Peter Kroger, Soviet spy who helped pass Manhattan Project secrets to the USSR
Morris Raphael Cohen (1880–1947), American Jewish philosopher
Morris Davis (born 1958), American Air Force officer and lawyer
Morris Day (born 1957), American musician, composer and actor
Morris Dees (born 1936), American trial counsel and former direct mail marketeer for book publishing
Morus Elfryn (c.1948–2022), pronounced "Morris", Welsh musician and production manager
Morris Engel (1918–2005), American photographer, cinematographer, and filmmaker 
Morris Ernst (1888–1976), American lawyer and co-founder of the American Civil Liberties Union
Morris Finer (1917–1974), British lawyer and judge
Morris Fishbein (1889–1976), American physician and journal editor
Morris Meyer "Mickey" Fisher (1904/05–1963), American basketball coach
Morris Fuller Benton (1872–1948), American typeface designer
Morris Ginsberg (1889–1970), Litvak-British sociologist
Morris Gleitzman (born 1953), English-born Australian writer
Morris Graves (1910–2001), American expressionist painter
Morris Halle, (1923–2018), born Morris Pinkowitz, Latvian-American Jewish linguist and professor
Morris Harvey (1877–1944), British film actor
Morris Hatalsky (born 1951), American professional golfer
Morris Hillquit (1869–1933), American lawyer and founding leader of the Socialist Party of America
Morris Iemma, Australian politician and former Premier of New South Wales
Morris Janowitz (1919–1988), American sociologist and professor of sociological theory
Morris Kantor (1896–1974), Russian-born American painter 
Morris Kight (1919–2003), American gay rights pioneer and peace activist
Morris Kirksey (1895–1981), American track and field athlete and rugby union footballer
Morris Kleiner (born 1948), American economist 
Morris Kline (1908–1992), American professor of mathematics, writer on the history, philosophy, and teaching of mathematics
Morris Lapidus (1902–2001), American architect
Morris Levy (1927–1990), American music industry executive
Morris Lichtenstein (1889–1938), scholar, founder of the Society of Jewish Science
Morris Louis (1912–1962) born Morris Louis Bernstein, American painter
Morris Lukowich (born 1956), Canadian professional ice hockey player
Morris Maddocks (1928–2008), bishop in the Church of England
Morris McGregor (1923–2003), Canadian politician
Morris Michtom (1870–1938), Russian Jewish immigrant
Morris Mott (born 1946), Canadian professional ice hockey player 
Morris Edward Opler (1907–1996), American anthropologist and advocate of Japanese-American civil rights
Morris Ouma (born 1982), Kenyan cricketer
Morris Panych (born 1952), Canadian playwright, director and actor
Morris Pert (1947–2010), Scottish composer, drummer/percussionist and pianist 
Morris Perry (1925–2021), English television actor
Morris Peterson (born 1977), American professional basketball player
Morris Possoni (born 1984), Italian professional road bicycle racer 
Morris "Tubby" Raskin (1902–1981), American basketball player and coach
Morris Robinson (born 1969), American operatic bass
Morris Rosenfeld (1862–1923), real name Moshe Jacob Alter, American Yiddish poet originating from Eastern Europe
Morris "Moe" Savransky (1929–2022), American Major League Baseball pitcher
Morris Schinasi (1855–1928), American tobacco industrialist of Ottoman origin
Morris Sheppard (1875–1941), American politician serving as Congressman and Senator
Morris Stoloff (1898–1980), American musical composer
Morris Henry Sugarman (1889–1946), Russian Empire-born American architect
Morris Swadesh (1909–1967), American linguist, concentrating on historical linguistics in indigenous languages of the Americas
Morris Travers (1872–1961), English chemist
Morris Weiss (1915-2014), American comic book and comic strip artist and writer 
Morris West (1916–1999), Australian novelist and playwright
Morris Wilkins (1925–2015), inventor of the heart-shaped bathtub and champagne glass bathtub
Morris Williams (1809–1874), aka Nicander, Welsh clergyman and writer
Morris Wijesinghe (1941-2020), Sri Lankan Sinhala musician
Morris Winchevsky aka Ben Netz (1856–1932), Jewish socialist leader in London and the United States in the late 19th century

Fictional characters
Morris Bench aka Hydro-Man, Marvel Comics supervillain
Morris Fletcher, a character from the Carterverse, that appeared in The X-Files as well The Lone Gunmen, portrayed by Michael McKean
Morris O'Brian, character from the TV series 24 portrayed by actor Carlo Rota
Morris the Cat, advertising mascot for 9Lives brand cat food, voiced by John Erwin

See also
Morris (disambiguation)
Morris (surname), a family name (and a list of people with the name)
Maurice (given name)

English-language masculine given names